Victor Moritz Goldschmidt (1888–1947) was a Norwegian chemist and mineralogist considered the founder of geochemistry.

Victor Goldschmidt may also refer to:
 Victor Mordechai Goldschmidt (1853–1933), German mineralogist, natural philosopher and art collector
 Victor Goldschmidt (philosopher) (1914–1981), French philosopher and historian of philosophy